FC MITOS Novocherkassk was a Russian association football club from Novocherkassk, founded in 1999 as amateur club by construction company MITOS. In 2008 FC MITOS had its debut in semi-professional championship in the first league of Rostov Oblast, where it became the champion. In 2009 the club was supposed to participate in the highest league of Rostov Oblast, but applied for participation in the third Russian division (South zone), where it became the third this year. Since 2010 it played in the third-tier Russian Professional Football League (South zone). It was not registered for professional competition for the 2016–17 season.

Notable players
Had international caps for their respective countries. Players whose name is listed in bold represented their countries while playing for FC MITOS.

Russia
 Maksim Grigoryev

Uzbekistan
 Nikolay Shirshov

References

External links
Official website
Profile on 2liga.ru

Association football clubs established in 1993
Association football clubs disestablished in 2016
Defunct football clubs in Russia
Sport in Rostov Oblast
1993 establishments in Russia
2016 disestablishments in Russia
Novocherkassk